Homalopsis is a genus of snakes of the family Homalopsidae. The genus is restricted to South East Asia and includes five currently recognized species. Like all members of the family Homalopsidae, Homalopsis are rear-fanged and mildly venomous, though considered harmless to humans.

Habitat
Homalopsis are a freshwater aquatic species that are found in a wide range of habitats including ponds, rivers, flowing streams, swamps, marshes and other wetlands. Human disturbance and activity does not seem to hinder this species as much as others and can be actively found in disturbed habitat such as man-made drainage ditches and irrigated agriculture fields.

Behavior
This species is nocturnal and can be found in muddy bank holes or burrows during the day. It feeds primarily on fish but may also eat anurans and possibly crustaceans.

Reproduction 
Homalopsis are viviparous giving birth to live young.

Species
There are five species:
 Homalopsis buccata (Linnaeus, 1758)
 Homalopsis hardwickii Gray, 1842
 Homalopsis mereljcoxi Murphy, Voris, Murthy, Traub & Cumberbatch, 2012
 Homalopsis nigroventralis Deuve, 1970
 Homalopsis semizonata Blyth, 1855

References

Colubrids
Snake genera
Taxa named by Johan Conrad van Hasselt
Taxa named by Heinrich Kuhl